Suffolk County is the easternmost county  in the U.S. state of New York. It is mainly located on the eastern end of Long Island, but also includes several smaller islands. According to the 2020 United States census, the county's population was 1,525,920  making it the fourth-most populous county in the State of New York, and the most populous excluding the five counties of New York City. Its county seat is Riverhead, though most county offices are in Hauppauge. The county was named after the county of Suffolk in England, from where its earliest European settlers came.

Suffolk County incorporates the easternmost extreme of the New York City metropolitan area. Most of the island is near sea level, with over 1,000 miles of coastline.

Like other parts of Long Island, the high population density and relative closeness to New York City means that the economy has a mix of industry and science satellite to the city alongside more rural activities like agriculture, a fishery and tourism. Major scientific research facilities in Suffolk County include Brookhaven National Laboratory in Upton, Cold Spring Harbor Laboratory in Huntington, and Plum Island Animal Disease Center on Plum Island. The county is also home to several major universities, including Stony Brook University and Farmingdale State College.

History

Suffolk County was part of the Connecticut Colony before becoming an original county of the Province of New York, one of twelve created in 1683. From 1664 until 1683 it had been the East Riding of Yorkshire. Its boundaries were essentially the same as at present, with only minor changes in the boundary with its western neighbor, which was originally Queens County but has been Nassau County since the separation of Nassau from Queens in 1899.

According to the Suffolk County website, the county is the leading agricultural county in the state of New York, saying that: "The weather is temperate, clean water is abundant, and the soil is so good that Suffolk is the leading agricultural county in New York State. That Suffolk is still number one in farming, even with the development that has taken place, is a tribute to thoughtful planning, along with the excellent soil, favorable weather conditions, and the work of the dedicated farmers in this region."

Geography

It is the second-largest county in New York by total area and occupies 66% of the land area of Long Island.

Suffolk County occupies the central and eastern part of Long Island, in the extreme east of the State of New York. The eastern end of the county splits into two peninsulas, known as the North Fork and the South Fork. The eastern end contains large bays.

The highest elevation in the county, and on Long Island as a whole, is Jayne's Hill in West Hills, at 401 feet (122 m) above sea level. This low lying-geography means that much of the county is vulnerable to sea level rise.

Climate
Suffolk County sits at the convergence of climate zones including the humid continental (Dfa) and humid subtropical (Cfa), bordering closely on an oceanic climate (Cfb). The majority of the county by land area is in the Dfa zone. Summers are cooler at the east end than in the western part of the county. The hardiness zone is 7a, except in Copiague Harbor, Lindenhurst, and Montauk, where it is 7b. PRISM Climate Group, Oregon State U On February 9, 2013, Suffolk County was besieged with 30 inches of snow, making it the largest day of snowfall on record in Suffolk.

Adjacent counties
 Nassau County - west
 Fairfield County, Connecticut - northwest
 New Haven County, Connecticut - north
 Middlesex County, Connecticut - north
 New London County, Connecticut - north
 Washington County, Rhode Island - northeast

National protected areas

 Amagansett National Wildlife Refuge
 Conscience Point National Wildlife Refuge
 Elizabeth A. Morton National Wildlife Refuge
 Fire Island National Seashore
 Sayville National Wildlife Refuge
 Seatuck National Wildlife Refuge
 Target Rock National Wildlife Refuge
 Wertheim National Wildlife Refuge

Demographics

According to the 2010 U.S. census there were 1,493,350 people and 569,985 households residing in the county. The census estimated Suffolk County's population decreased slightly to 1,481,093 in 2018, representing 7.5% of the census-estimated New York State population of 19,745,289 and 19.0% of the census-estimated Long Island population of 7,869,820. However, by 2012, with an estimated total population increasing moderately to 1,499,273 there were 569,359 housing units. As of 2006, Suffolk County was the 21st-most populous county in the United States.

By 2014, the county's racial makeup was estimated at 85.2% White, 8.3% African American, 0.6% Native American, 4.0% Asian, 0.1% Pacific Islander, and 1.8% from two or more races. Those identifying as Hispanic or Latino, of any race, were 18.2% of the population. Those who identified as "white alone", not being of Hispanic or Latino origin, represented 69.3% of the population. In 2006, the county's racial or ethnic makeup was 83.6% White (75.4% White Non-Hispanic). African Americans were 7.4% of the population. Asians stood at 3.4% of the population. 5.4% were of other or mixed race. Latinos were 13.0% of the population. In 2007, Suffolk County's most common ethnicities were Italian (29.5%), Irish (24.0%), and German (17.6%).

In 2002, The New York Times cited a study by the non-profit group ERASE Racism, which determined Suffolk and its neighboring county, Nassau, to be the most racially segregated suburbs in the United States.

In 2006, there were 469,299 households, of which 37.00% had children under the age of 18 living with them, 62.00% were married couples living together, 10.80% had a female householder with no husband present, and 23.20% were non-families. 18.30% of all households were made up of individuals, and 7.80% had someone living alone who was 65 years of age or older. The average household size was 2.96 and the average family size was 3.36.

In the county, the population was spread out, with 26.10% under the age of 18, 7.60% from 18 to 24, 31.20% from 25 to 44, 23.30% from 45 to 64, and 11.80% who were 65 years of age or older. The median age was 36 years. For every 100 females, there were 95.90 males. For every 100 females age 18 and over, there were 92.80 males.

In 2008, Forbes magazine released its American Community Survey and named Suffolk County number 4 in its list of the top 25 richest counties in America. In 2016, according to Business Insider, the 11962 zip code encompassing Sagaponack, within Southampton, was listed as the most expensive in the U.S., with a median home sale price of $8.5 million.

The median income for a household in the county was $84,767, and the median income for a family was $72,112. Males had a median income of $50,046 versus $33,281 for females. The per capita income for the county was $26,577. Using a weighted average from 2009 to 2014 about 6.40% of the population were below the poverty line In earlier censuses, the population below the poverty line included 2.70% of those under age 18 and 2.30% of those age 65 or over.

2020 Census

Law and government

|}

Suffolk County had long been a Republican bastion in the State of New York. U.S. Congressman Rick Lazio, who opposed Hillary Clinton in the 2000 Senate race, was from Suffolk County. However, the county shifted more toward the Democrats starting in the 1990s. In 2003, Democrat Steve Levy was elected county executive, ending longtime Republican control. In 2001, Democrat Thomas Spota was elected District Attorney, and ran unopposed in 2005. Although Suffolk voters gave George H. W. Bush a victory here in 1992, the county voted for Bill Clinton in 1996 and continued the trend by giving Al Gore an 11-percent victory in the county in 2000. 2004 Democratic candidate John Kerry won by a much smaller margin of one percent, in 2008 Democratic candidate Barack Obama won by a slightly larger 4.4 percent margin, 52%-47%.

In 2016, Republican candidate Donald Trump won Suffolk County by a 6.9 percent margin, becoming the first Republican to carry the county since 1992. It was the only large county (over 200,000 voters) in the State of New York that Donald Trump won. In 2020, Trump again won Suffolk County; this time, however, it was decided by just 232 votes out of nearly 800,000 votes cast, making it the closest county in the nation in terms of percentage margin, and representing nearly a seven-point swing towards the Democratic ticket of former Vice President Joe Biden and junior California senator Kamala Harris. In percentage terms, it was the closest county in the state, although Ontario County and Warren County had narrower raw vote margins of just 33 and 57 votes, respectively. Suffolk was one of five counties in the state that Trump won by less than 500 votes. With Tarrant County, Texas and Maricopa County, Arizona flipping Democratic in 2020, Suffolk was the most populous county in the nation to vote for Trump.

As a whole both Suffolk and Nassau counties are considered swing counties. However, until 2016 they tended not to receive significant attention from presidential candidates, as the state of New York has turned reliably Democratic at the national level. In 2008 and 2012, Hofstra University in Nassau County hosted a presidential debate. Hofstra hosted the first debate of the 2016 presidential election season, on September 26, 2016, making Hofstra the first college or university in the United States to host a presidential debate in three consecutive elections. The presence on the 2016 ticket of Westchester County resident Hillary Clinton and Manhattan resident Donald Trump resulted in greater attention by the candidates to the concerns of Long Island. Trump visited Long Island voters and donors at least four times while Clinton made one stop for voters and one additional stop in the Hamptons for donors. After the 2022 midterm election results were counted, Suffolk appears to have moved further to the right. Republican gubernatorial candidate and Suffolk County native Lee Zeldin won the county by more than 17 points over the Democrat candidate Kathy Hochul.

Suffolk County Executives

* Appointed to complete Cohalan's term

** Levy was originally elected as a Democrat, but became a Republican in 2010.

Suffolk County Legislature
The county has 18 legislative districts, each represented by a legislator. As of 2022, there were 10 Republicans, 7 Democrats, and 1 Conservative.

Historical composition of the Suffolk County Legislature 

Republicans controlled the county legislature until a landmark election in November 2005 where three Republican seats switched to the Democrats, giving them control. In November 2007, the Democratic Party once again retained control over the Suffolk County Legislature, picking up one seat in the process. In November 2009, the Republican Party regained the seat lost in 2007 but remained in the minority for the 2010-2011 session. In November 2011, the Democratic Party maintained control over the Suffolk County Legislature picking up one seat that had been held by an Independence Party member. In November 2013, the Republican Party gained the 14th district seat, but remained in the minority until 2021, when the GOP flipped the county legislature, picking up three seats with incumbents Robert Calarco (the sitting Presiding Officer) and Susan Berland (the sitting Majority Leader) losing their bids for re-election.

During the 2020-2021 session, 7th district legislator Robert Calarco served as Presiding Officer, a position he was elected to in 2020, 5th district legislator Kara Hahn served as Deputy Presiding Officer. 18th district legislator William Spencer served as Majority Leader for the Democrats until his arrest for soliciting prostitution in a drugs for sex scandal.

Law enforcement

Police services in the five western towns (Babylon, Huntington, Islip, Smithtown and Brookhaven) are provided primarily by the Suffolk County Police Department. The five "East End" towns (Riverhead, Southold, Shelter Island, East Hampton, and Southampton), maintain their own police and other law enforcement agencies. Also, there are a number of villages, such as Amityville, Lloyd Harbor, Northport, and Westhampton Beach that maintain their own police forces.
In an unusual move, the Village of Greenport in 1994 voted to abolish its police department and turn responsibility for law and order over to the Southold Town Police Department.

After the Long Island State Parkway Police was disbanded in 1980, all state parkways in Suffolk County became the responsibility of Troop L of the New York State Police, headquartered at Republic Airport. State parks, such as Robert Moses State Park, are the responsibility of the New York State Park Police, based at Belmont Lake State Park. In 1996, the Long Island Rail Road Police Department was consolidated into the Metropolitan Transportation Authority Police, which has jurisdiction over all rail lines in the county. Since the New York state legislature created the New York State University Police in 1999, they are in charge of all law enforcement services for State University of New York property and campuses. The State University Police have jurisdiction in Suffolk County at Stony Brook University and Farmingdale State College.

The Suffolk County Sheriff's Office is a separate agency. The sheriff, an elected official who serves a four-year term, operates the two Suffolk County correctional facilities (in Yaphank and Riverhead), provides county courthouse security and detention, service and enforcement of civil papers, evictions and warrants. The Sheriff's Office is also responsible for securing all county-owned property, such as county government office buildings, as well as the campuses of the Suffolk County Community College. As of 2008, the Suffolk County Sheriff's Office employed 275 Deputy Sheriffs, 850 corrections officers, and about 200 civilian staff.

Suffolk County has a long maritime history with several outer barrier beaches and hundreds of square miles of waterways. Some Suffolk County towns (Islip, Brookhaven, Southampton, East Hampton, Babylon, Huntington, Smithtown) also employ various bay constables and other local marine patrol, which are sworn armed peace officers with full arrest powers, providing back up to the Suffolk Police Marine Bureau as well as the United States Coast Guard.

This includes Fire Island and parts of Jones Island barrier beaches and the islands of the Great South Bay. Marine units also respond to water and ice rescues on the inland lakes, ponds, and streams of the District.

In February 2019, legislator Robert Trotta (R-Fort Salonga) put forward a resolution to recover salary and benefits from James Burke, the county's former police chief. Burke had pled guilty to beating a man while in police custody and attempting to conceal it, and the county had paid the victim $1.5 million in a settlement; it had also paid Burke more than $500,000 in benefits and salary while Burke was concealing his conduct. Trotta said that the faithless servant doctrine in New York common law gave him the power to claw back the compensation. The Suffolk County Legislature supported the suit unanimously. The following month Suffolk County Executive Steve Bellone signed the bill.

Also in February 2019, a court ruled against the Suffolk County jail in the case of a former inmate who was denied hormone replacement therapy by the jail's doctors. Documents introduced in the trial indicate 11 other inmates were also denied treatment.

Courts

Suffolk County is part of the 10th Judicial District of the New York State Unified Court System; is home to the Alfonse M. D'Amato Courthouse of the Federal U.S. District Court, Eastern District of New York; and has various local municipal courts. The State Courts are divided into Supreme Court, which has general jurisdiction over all cases, and lower courts that either hear claims of a limited dollar amount, or of a specific nature.  Similarly, the local courts hear claims of a limited dollar amount, or hear specific types of cases. The Federal Court has jurisdiction over Federal Claims, State Law claims that are joined with Federal claims, and claims where there is a diversity of citizenship.

Supreme Court
 The Suffolk County Supreme Court is a trial court of unlimited general original jurisdiction, but it generally only hears cases that are outside the subject-matter jurisdiction of other trial courts of more limited jurisdiction. The Suffolk County Clerk is the Clerk of the Court of the Supreme Court.
 The main courthouse for the Supreme Court is in Riverhead, which has been the court's home since 1729. The original courthouse was replaced in 1855, and that courthouse was expanded in 1881. The courthouse was damaged by fire and rebuilt in 1929. In 1994, a new court building was added to the complex. This Courthouse was dedicated as the "Alan D. Oshrin Supreme Court Building" on August 1, 2011.
 The Supreme Court also shares space in the Cohalan Court Complex in Central Islip with several other courts and county agencies. Matrimonial actions are heard in the Supreme Court, and those matters are generally heard in the Supreme Court section of the Cohalan Court Complex.

Other Superior Courts
 The Suffolk County Court is a trial court of limited jurisdiction. It has jurisdiction over all of Suffolk County, and is authorized to handle criminal prosecutions of both felonies and lesser offenses committed within the county, although in practice most minor offenses are handled by the local courts. It is the trial court for felonies, or where a person is indicted by a Grand Jury in Suffolk County. The County Court also has limited jurisdiction in civil cases, generally involving amounts up to $25,000. The County Court is in the Cromarty Court Complex Criminal Courts Building in Riverhead.
 The Suffolk County Surrogate's Court hears cases involving the affairs of decedents, including the probate of wills and the administration of estates, guardianships, and adoptions. The Surrogate's Court is in the County Center in Riverhead.
 The Suffolk County Family Court has jurisdiction over all of Suffolk County in petitions filed for Neglect & Abuse, Juvenile Delinquency/Designated Felonies, Persons in Need of Supervision, Adoption, Guardianship, Foster Care, Family Offense (Order of Protection), Custody & Visitation, Paternity, Support Matters (Child & Spousal), Consent to Marry. The court also has a Juvenile Drug Court and Family Treatment Court. Individuals, attorneys, and agencies may initiate a proceeding in the Family Court with the filing of a petition. The Suffolk County Family Court is in the Cohalan Court Complex in Central Islip and maintains a facility in Riverhead. Case assignment is dependent upon the geographical location of the parties.

Local courts
The District Court and the Town and Village Courts are the local courts of Suffolk County. There are more than 30 local courts, each with limited criminal and civil subject matter and geographic jurisdictions. The local criminal courts have trial jurisdiction over misdemeanors, violations and infractions; preliminary jurisdiction over felonies; and traffic tickets charging a crime. The local civil courts calendar small claims, evictions, and civil actions.
 Suffolk County District Court has geographic jurisdiction over the 5 western towns of Suffolk County (Babylon, Brookhaven, Huntington, Islip & Smithtown). The Criminal division of the Suffolk District Court is in the Cohalan Court Complex, Central Islip, and includes Domestic Violence Courts, Drug Court, and a Mental Health Court. The Civil division is divided up in the 5 "outlying" courthouses in Lindenhurst, Huntington Station, Hauppauge, Ronkonkoma, and Patchogue. Civil actions may be filed up to $15,000, and small claims actions up to $5000. Actions are commenced by filing with the court. Summary proceedings under the RPAPL are filed in the district where the property is located.
 The Town Courts of East Hampton, Riverhead, Shelter Island, Southampton, and Southold have geographic jurisdiction over the 5 eastern towns of Suffolk County. Each town maintains a courthouse where judges hear criminal cases (including a regional Drug Court) and civil actions. Civil actions are commenced by serving a summons and complaint for claims up to $3,000, and small claims actions are heard up to $3000. Summary proceedings under the RPAPL are filed in the town where the property is located.
 The Village Courts of Amityville, Asharoken, Babylon, Belle Terre, Bellport, Brightwaters, Head of the Harbor, Huntington Bay, Islandia, Lake Grove, Lindenhurst, Lloyd Harbor, Nissequogue, Northport, Ocean Beach, Old Field, Patchogue, Poquott, Port Jefferson, Quogue, Sag Harbor, Saltaire, Shoreham, Southampton, Village of the Branch, West Hampton Dunes, and Westhampton Beach have geographic jurisdiction within each incorporated village. Criminal and civil subject matter jurisdiction varies in each court.

Most non-criminal moving violation tickets issued in the 5 west towns are handled by the Traffic Violations Bureau, which is part of the New York State Department of Motor Vehicles, not the court system.

Economy

Education

Colleges and universities

 State University of New York
 Stony Brook University - main campus in Stony Brook, satellite campus in Southampton
 Farmingdale State College - East Farmingdale
 Suffolk County Community College - Campuses in Selden, Riverhead, and Brentwood, satellite centers in Sayville and Riverhead

 Private
 Five Towns College - Dix Hills
 St. Joseph's University - Patchogue
 Touro University System
 The School of Health Sciences of Touro College - Central Islip
 Touro Law Center - Central Islip
 Watson School of Biological Sciences - Cold Spring Harbor
 Satellite and branch campuses
 Adelphi University - Hauppauge Education and Conference Center in Hauppauge
 Long Island University - Brentwood and Riverhead, on the campuses of Suffolk County Community College
 Molloy University - Suffolk Center in Amityville

School districts
School districts (all officially designated for grades K-12) include:

 Amagansett Union Free School District
 Amityville Union Free School District
 Babylon Union Free School District
 Bay Shore Union Free School District
 Bayport-Blue Point Union Free School District
 Brentwood Union Free School District
 Bridgehampton Union Free School District
 Brookhaven-Comsewogue Union Free School District
 Center Moriches Union Free School District
 Central Islip Union Free School District
 Cold Spring Harbor Central School District
 Commack Union Free School District
 Connetquot Central School District
 Copiague Union Free School District
 Deer Park Union Free School District
 East Hampton Union Free School District
 East Islip Union Free School District
 East Moriches Union Free School District
 East Quogue Union Free School District
 Eastport-South Manor Central School District
 Elwood Union Free School District
 Farmingdale Union Free School District
 Fire Island Union Free School District (Only operates elementary school)
 Fishers Island Union Free School District
 William Floyd Union Free School District
 Greenport Union Free School District
 Half Hollow Hills Central School District
 Hampton Bays Union Free School District
 Harborfields Central School District
 Hauppauge Union Free School District
 Huntington Union Free School District
 Islip Union Free School District
 Kings Park Central School District
 Lindenhurst Union Free School District
 Middle Country Central School District
 Longwood Central School District
 Mattituck-Cutchogue Union Free School District
 Miller Place Union Free School District
 Montauk Union Free School District
 Mount Sinai Union Free School District
 New Suffolk Common School District
 North Babylon Union Free School District
 Northport-East Northport Union Free School District
 Oysterponds Union Free School District
 Patchogue-Medford Union Free School District
 Port Jefferson Union Free School District
 Quogue Union Free School District
 Remsenburg-Speonk Union Free School District
 Riverhead Central School District
 Rocky Point Union Free School District
 Sachem Central School District
 Sag Harbor Union Free School District
 Sagaponack Common School District
 Sayville Union Free School District
 Shelter Island Union Free School District
 Shoreham-Wading River Central School District
 Smithtown Central School District
 South Country Central School District
 South Huntington Union Free School District
 Southampton Union Free School District
 Southold Union Free School District
 Springs Union Free School District
 Three Village Central School District
 Tuckahoe Common School District
 Wainscott Common School District
 West Babylon Union Free School District
 West Islip Union Free School District
 Westhampton Beach Union Free School District
 Wyandanch Union Free School District

Media

Newspapers
 Amityville Record
 Bayport-Blue Point Gazette
 Dan's Papers
 Fire Island News
 Newsday
 Sayville Gazette
 Shelter Island Reporter
 The Beacon
 The East Hampton Press
 The East Hampton Star
 The Islip Bulletin
 The Long Island Advance
 The Port Times Record
 The Riverhead News-Review
 The Shelter Island Reporter
 The Southampton Press
 The Suffolk County News
 The Suffolk Times
 The Tide of Moriches and Manorville
 The Times Beacon Record
 The Times of Huntington
 The Times of Middle Country
 The Times of Northport and East Northport
 The Times of Smithtown
 The Village Beacon Record
 The Village Times Herald

Radio stations
 WALK-FM, Patchogue
 WAPP-LP, Westhampton
 WBAB, Babylon
 WBAZ, Bridgehampton
 WBEA, Southold
 WBLI, Patchogue
 WBON, Westhampton
 WBWD, Islip
 WBZO, Bay Shore
 WEER, Montauk
 WEGB, Napeague
 WEGQ, Quogue
 WEHM, Manorville
 WEHN, East Hampton
 WELJ, Montauk
 WFRS, Smithtown
 WFTU, Riverhead
 WGSS, Copiague
 WHFM, Southampton
 WJJF, Montauk
 WJVC, Center Moriches
 WLID, Patchogue
 WLIM, Medford
 WLIR-FM, Hampton Bays
 WLIW-FM, Southampton
 WLIX-LP, Ridge
 WLNG, Sag Harbor
 WNYG, Patchogue
 WNYH, Huntington
 WPTY, Calverton-Roanoke
 WRCN-FM, Riverhead
 WRIV, Riverhead
 WRLI, Southampton
 WSHR, Lake Ronkonkoma
 WSUF, Noyack
 WUSB, Stony Brook
 WWSK, Smithtown
 WXBA, Brentwood

Television stations
 WFTY-DT, Smithtown
 WLNY-TV, Riverhead
 WVVH-CD, Southampton

Suffolk seashore

Fire Island Lighthouse was an important landmark for many trans-Atlantic ships coming into New York Harbor in the early 20th century. For many European immigrants, the Fire Island Light was their first sight of land upon arrival in America.

The Fire Island Inlet span of the Robert Moses Causeway connects to Robert Moses State Park on the western tip of Fire Island.

The Great South Bay Bridge, the first causeway bridge, had only one northbound and one southbound lane, was opened to traffic in April 1954.

After crossing the State Boat Channel over its -long bascule bridge, the causeway meets the Ocean Parkway at a cloverleaf interchange. This interchange provides access to Captree State Park, Gilgo State Park and Jones Beach State Park.

The Fire Island Inlet Bridge continues the two-lane road, one lane in each direction, across Fire Island Inlet to its terminus at Robert Moses State Park and The Fire Island Lighthouse. Robert Moses Causeway opened in 1964.

Suffolk County has the most lighthouses of any United States county, with 15 of its original 26 lighthouses still standing. Of these 15, eight are in Southold township alone, giving it more lighthouses than any other township in the United States.

Secessionist movements

At various times, there have been proposals for a division of Suffolk County into two counties. The western portion would be called Suffolk County, while the eastern portion of the current Suffolk County would comprise a new county to be called Peconic County. Peconic County would consist of the five easternmost towns of Suffolk County: East Hampton, Riverhead, Shelter Island, Southampton and Southold, plus the Shinnecock Indian Reservation.

The proposed Peconic County flag showed the two forks at the east end of Long Island separated by Peconic Bay. The star on the north represents Southold. The stars on the South Fork represent Southampton and East Hampton. Riverhead is at the fork mouth and Shelter Island is between the forks.

The secessionist movement has not been active since 1998.

The End of the Hamptons: Scenes from the Class Struggle in America's Paradise, by Corey Dolgon (New York University Press, 2005) examined the class roots of the secessionist movement in the Hamptons. In his review, Howard Zinn wrote that the book "[t]akes us beyond the much-romanticized beaches of Long Island to the rich entrepreneurs and their McMansions, the Latino workers, and the stubborn indigenous residents refusing to disappear. The book is important because it is in so many ways a microcosm of the nation." The book won the Association for Humanist Sociology's 2005 Book Prize and the American Sociological Association's Marxist Section Book Award in 2007.

Matt DeSimone, a young adult from Southold, and his partner Jake Dominy unsuccessfully started a similar movement in the late 2010s.

Finance and taxation
Suffolk County has an 8.625% sales tax, compared to an overall New York State sales tax of 4%, consisting of an additional 4.25% on top of the state and MTA assessment of .375%

Health 
In March 2020, the COVID-19 pandemic first affected the county. As of December 12, 2020, there are a total of 73,281 cases and 2,153 deaths.

Communities

In the State of New York, a town is the major subdivision of each county. Towns provide or arrange for most municipal services for residents of hamlets and selected services for residents of villages. All residents of New York who do not live in a city or on an Indian reservation live in a town. A village is an incorporated area which is usually, but not always, within a single town. A village is a clearly defined municipality that provides the services closest to the residents, such as garbage collection, street and highway maintenance, street lighting and building codes. Some villages provide their own police and other optional services. A hamlet is an informally defined populated area within a town that is not part of a village.

Figures in parentheses are 2019 population estimates from the Census Bureau.

Towns

 Babylon (210,141)
 Brookhaven (480,763)
 East Hampton (22,047)
 Huntington (200,503)
 Islip (329,610)
 Riverhead (33,469)
 Shelter Island (2,417)
 Smithtown (116,022)
 Southampton (58,398)
 Southold (22,170)

Villages (incorporated)

 Amityville (9,399)
 Asharoken (646)
 Babylon (11,992)
 Belle Terre (786)
 Bellport (2,047)
 Brightwaters (3,059)
 Dering Harbor (11)
 East Hampton (1,134)
 Greenport (2,231)
 Head of the Harbor (1,458)
 Huntington Bay (1,437)
 Islandia (3,309)
 Lake Grove (11,056)
 Lindenhurst (26,801)
 Lloyd Harbor (3,658)
 Nissequogue (1,732)
 North Haven (892)
 Northport (7,273)
 Ocean Beach (83)
 Old Field (909)
 Patchogue (12,321)
 Poquott (928)
 Port Jefferson (8,145)
 Quogue (1,014)
 Sag Harbor (2,283)
 Sagaponack (323)
 Saltaire (41)
 Shoreham (531)
 Southampton (3,307)
 Village of the Branch (1,793)
 Westhampton Beach (1,797)
 West Hampton Dunes (58)

Census-designated places (unincorporated)

 Amagansett
 Aquebogue
 Baiting Hollow
 Bay Shore
 Bayport
 Baywood
 Blue Point
 Bohemia
 Brentwood
 Bridgehampton
 Brookhaven
 Calverton
 Captree
 Center Moriches
 Centereach
 Centerport
 Central Islip
 Cold Spring Harbor
 Commack
 Copiague
 Coram
 Cutchogue
 Deer Park
 Dix Hills
 East Farmingdale
 East Hampton North
 East Islip
 East Marion
 East Moriches
 East Northport
 East Patchogue
 East Quogue
 East Setauket
 East Shoreham
 Eastport
 Eatons Neck
 Elwood
 Farmingville
 Fire Island
 Fishers Island
 Flanders
 Fort Salonga
 Gilgo
 Gordon Heights
 Great River
 Greenlawn
 Greenport West
 Halesite
 Hampton Bays
 Hauppauge
 Holbrook
 Holtsville
 Huntington
 Huntington Station
 Islip
 Islip Terrace
 Jamesport
 Kings Park
 Lake Ronkonkoma
 Laurel
 Manorville
 Mastic
 Mastic Beach
 Mattituck
 Medford
 Melville
 Middle Island
 Miller Place
 Montauk
 Moriches
 Mount Sinai
 Napeague
 Nesconset
 New Suffolk
 North Amityville
 North Babylon
 North Bay Shore
 North Bellport
 North Great River
 North Lindenhurst
 North Patchogue
 North Sea
 Northampton
 Northville
 Northwest Harbor
 Noyack
 Oak Beach
 Oakdale
 Orient
 Peconic
 Port Jefferson Station
 Quiogue
 Remsenburg-Speonk
 Ridge
 Riverhead
 Riverside
 Rocky Point
 Ronkonkoma
 Sayville
 Selden
 Setauket
 Shelter Island
 Shelter Island Heights
 Shinnecock
 Shirley
 Smithtown
 Sound Beach
 South Huntington
 Southold
 Springs
 St. James
 Stony Brook
 Stony Brook University
 Terryville
 Tuckahoe
 Wading River
 Wainscott
 Water Mill
 West Babylon
 West Bay Shore
 West Hills
 West Islip
 West Sayville
 Westhampton
 Wheatley Heights
 Wyandanch
 Yaphank

Gardiners Island

Gardiners Island is an island off eastern Suffolk County. The same family has owned the Island for nearly 400 years; one of the largest privately owned islands in America or the world. In addition, it is the only American real estate still intact as part of an original royal grant from the English Crown.

Robins Island

Robins Island is an Island in the Peconic Bay between the North and South folks of eastern Suffolk County. It is within the jurisdiction of Town of Southold in Suffolk County, New York. The island is privately owned and not accessible to the public.

Indian reservations
Two Indian reservations are within the borders of Suffolk County:
 Shinnecock Reservation
 Poospatuck Reservation

Transportation
The county includes a lot of roadways and other public transportation infrastructure. The local Suffolk County Legislature oversees funding and regulations for the infrastructure. In 2019, the legislature required all new projects to account for future climate change caused sea level rise.

Major highways
 I-495 (Long Island Expressway) traverses the county from the Nassau County line in the West to Riverhead in the East. Original plans called for the Expressway to extend further past Riverhead and along the island's North Fork, possibly to Orient Point, where a crossing to Connecticut could be built. The expressway connects to Manhattan via the Queens-Midtown Tunnel.
 New York State Route 27 crosses the county from the Nassau County line in the West to Montauk Point in the East, which is also the easternmost point in the State of New York. The road is limited-access from West Babylon to Southampton.

Airports
Commercial Airport:

 Long Island MacArther Airport (ISP/KISP)

General Aviation Airport:

 Republic Airport (FRG/KFRG)
 Brookhaven Calabro Airport (WSH/KHWV/HWV)
 Francis S. Gabreski Airport (FOK/KFOK)
 Town of East Hampton Airport (JPX/KJPX)
 Elizabeth Field (Fisher's Island) (FID/0B8)

Public transportation
Suffolk County is served by Suffolk County Transit. Long Island Rail Road, the Hampton Jitney, and Hampton Luxury Liner connect Suffolk County to New York City.

Notable people
 Kevin James – was raised in Stony Brook
 Mick Foley – was raised in East Setauket
 Loudon Wainwright III resides here
 Carl Yastrzemski – was raised in Southampton
 Craig Biggio – was raised in Kings Parklands
 R.A The Rugged Man – Was Raised in Suffolk county and mentioned it in alot of his Songs

See also
 National Register of Historic Places listings in Suffolk County, New York
 Suffolk County, Farmland Development Rights
 USS Suffolk County (LST-1173)
 List of counties in New York

References

Bibliography 

  ; .
<li>

External links

 
 Long Island History: Suffolk County
 Suffolk County Police
 Suffolk Historical Newspapers
 Map of Suffolk County CDPs in 2010
 Map of Suffolk County CDPs in 2000

 
Counties in the New York metropolitan area
Long Island Sound
1683 establishments in the Province of New York
Populated places established in 1683